Mustafa Erkin Koray (born 24 June 1941) is a Turkish musician, electro-baglama player, and active in Anatolian rock.

Career 
Koray has been in the Turkish folk music scene since the late 1950s. In 1957, he and his band began playing covers of Elvis Presley and Fats Domino.
In 1967, he released his first psychedelic single "Anma Arkadaş". Koray followed this with a number of singles, both by himself and in collaboration with others.
In the early 1970s, he formed the group Ter ("Sweat"), with former members of the band Bunalım (Group Depression). They only recorded one single, "Hor Görme Garibi", before breaking up. In 1973, his first album, Erkin Koray, was released, with singles from 1967 to 1973. He left Istanbul Records after the release of the album and, in 1974, signed with Doglan Records, which released his dabke single "Şaşkın".
In 1974, Koray released the LP  Elektronik Türküler (Electronic Folk Songs [of Turkey]). In Turkish music circles he is often referred to as Erkin Baba ("Erkin the Father") for his pioneering influence on Turkish popular music. Other hits by Koray are "Fesuphanallah", "Istemem", "Sevince", "Öyle Bir Geçer Zaman ki", "Estarabim", "Arap Saçı", "Yalnızlar Rıhtımı", "Akrebin Gözleri", and "Çöpçüler".
Koray is the inventor of electro baglama, the electrified version of a traditional Turkish musical instrument related to the lute.

Discography 
Studio albums
Erkin Koray (1973)
Elektronik Türküler (1974)
2 (1976)
Erkin Koray Tutkusu (1977)
Benden Sana (1982)
İlla Ki (1983)
Ceylan (1985)
Gaddar (1986)
Çukulatam Benim (1987)
Hay Yam Yam (1989)
Tamam Artık (1990)
Gün Ola Harman Ola (1996)
Devlerin Nefesi (1999)

See also 
List of Turkish musicians

References

External links 
 Full Erkin Koray Discography
 Erkin Koray Video
26 Best Anatolian Rock & Turkish Psychedelic Rock Songs, ATDAA

1941 births
Living people
Turkish folk musicians
Turkish tambur players
Turkish rock musicians
Turkish bass guitarists
Deutsche Schule Istanbul alumni
Haydarpaşa High School alumni
Acoustic guitarists
Sitar players
Turkish oud players
Turkish rock guitarists
Santur players
Turkish lyricists
Psychedelic folk musicians
Turkish music arrangers
Turkish male songwriters
Turkish composers
20th-century Turkish male musicians
21st-century Turkish male musicians 
People from Kadıköy
Idealism (Turkey)
Folk rock musicians
Turkish hip hop musicians
Turkish folk-pop singers
Turkish record producers
Anatolian rock musicians
Turkish nationalists
Nationalist musicians